Bianzhou or Bian Prefecture was a zhou (prefecture) in imperial China seated in modern Kaifeng, Henan, China. It existed (intermittently) from 576 to Later Jin's reign (936–947).

Eastern Wei first created the Liangzhou and Chengliujung. Northern Qi abolished Kaifengjun which administered Kaifengxian. Northern Zhou Xuandi (578–579) changed the name of Liangzhou to Bianzhou and so Bianshui became its name. The Junyixian was its administrative center, today's Kaifeng. This too was abolished during the Sui Dynasty and the area came under administration of Xingyanjun.

In the year 621, this area was administrated by Zhengzhou, which included Junyixian, Kaifengxian, and Huazhou's Qiuxian.

Geography
The administrative region of Tongzhou in the Tang dynasty is in modern Henan: 
 Under the administration of Kaifeng:
 Kaifeng
 Kaifeng County
 Qi County
 Tongxu County
 Weishi County
 Lankao County
 Under the administration of Xinxiang:
 Fengqiu County

See also
Chenliu Commandery
Kaifeng Prefecture

References
 

Prefectures of the Sui dynasty
Prefectures of the Tang dynasty
Prefectures of Later Tang
Former prefectures in Henan